Ján Pardavý (born 8 September 1971) is a Slovak professional ice hockey coach and former player. He competed in the men's tournaments at the 1998 Winter Olympics and the 2002 Winter Olympics.

Career statistics

Regular season and playoffs
Bold indicates led league

International

References

External links
 

1971 births
Living people
Olympic ice hockey players of Slovakia
Ice hockey players at the 1998 Winter Olympics
Ice hockey players at the 2002 Winter Olympics
Sportspeople from Trenčín
HK Dukla Trenčín players
VHK Vsetín players
HC '05 Banská Bystrica players
Czechoslovak ice hockey right wingers
Slovak ice hockey right wingers
Expatriate ice hockey players in France
Slovak ice hockey coaches
Slovak expatriate ice hockey players in Russia
Slovak expatriate ice hockey players in the Czech Republic
Slovak expatriate sportspeople in France
Slovak expatriate ice hockey players in Finland
Slovak expatriate ice hockey players in Sweden